The United People's Movement was a political party in Antigua and Barbuda led by former Prime Minister George Walter. The only general elections it contested were those of 1984, in which the party received 23% of the vote, but failed to win a seat.

References

Defunct political parties in Antigua and Barbuda
Political parties with year of establishment missing
Political parties with year of disestablishment missing